Jussi Pernaa is a Finnish former ice hockey defenceman who played professionally in Finland for Lukko of the SM-liiga and Sport Vaasa.

Career statistics

References

External links

Living people
Finnish ice hockey defencemen
1983 births
FoPS players
Ilves players
Lempäälän Kisa players
Lukko players
Vaasan Sport players